Wes Barrot (born 8 October 1953) is a former Australian rules footballer who played with Richmond and Collingwood in the Victorian Football League (VFL).

Notes

External links 		

		
		

1953 births
Australian rules footballers from Victoria (Australia)		
Richmond Football Club players		
Collingwood Football Club players
Living people